Abdullah Ibrahim Yahya Otayf (born 3 August 1992) is a Saudi Arabian footballer who plays for Saudi Pro League side Al-Hilal as a midfielder.

Club career
He joined Louletano a Portuguese Second Division team after his promotion from the youth academy.

International career
He represented Saudi Arabia in 2011 U20 World Cup. He made his senior debut against Iran on 9 December 2012. He scored his first goal against Yemen In that match he celebrated using a Sergio Busquets shirt
In May 2018 he was named in Saudi Arabia's preliminary squad for the 2018 FIFA World Cup in Russia.

Career statistics

Club

International
Statistics accurate as of match played 22 October 2022.

International goals

Honours

Club
Al-Hilal
 Saudi Professional League: 2016–17, 2017–18, 2019–20, 2020–21, 2021–22
 King Cup: 2015, 2017, 2019–20
 Crown Prince Cup: 2015–16
 Saudi Super Cup: 2015, 2018, 2021
AFC Champions League: 2019, 2021

Individual
 24th Arabian Gulf Cup MVP

References

External links

1992 births
Living people
Association football midfielders
Saudi Arabian footballers
Sportspeople from Riyadh
Al-Shabab FC (Riyadh) players
Louletano D.C. players
Al Hilal SFC players
Saudi Arabian expatriate sportspeople in Portugal
Expatriate footballers in Portugal
Saudi Arabian expatriate footballers
Footballers at the 2014 Asian Games
Saudi Arabia youth international footballers
Saudi Professional League players
2018 FIFA World Cup players
2019 AFC Asian Cup players
Saudi Arabia international footballers
Asian Games competitors for Saudi Arabia
20th-century Saudi Arabian people
21st-century Saudi Arabian people
2022 FIFA World Cup players